A pumpkin festival is a type of annual festival celebrating the autumn harvest of pumpkins. They are typically celebrated around October in the Northern Hemisphere.

"Pumpkin festival" may refer to:

Republic of Ireland 
 Virginia Pumpkin Festival at Virginia, County Caven

United States 
 Barnesville Pumpkin Festival at Barnesville, Ohio
 Circleville Pumpkin Show at Circleville, Ohio
 Half Moon Bay Art and Pumpkin Festival at Half Moon Bay, California
 New Hampshire Pumpkin Festival at Laconia, New Hampshire (previously the Keene Pumpkin Festival at Keene, New Hampshire)